The Cape Verdean Armed Forces, Cabo Verdean Armed Forces or FACV are the military of Cape Verde. They include two branches, the National Guard and the Coast Guard.

History

Before 1975, Cape Verde was an overseas province of Portugal, having a small Portuguese military garrison that included both Cape Verdean and European Portuguese soldiers.

At the same time, some Cape Verdeans were serving in the People's Revolutionary Armed Forces (FARP), the military wing of the African Party for the Independence of Guinea and Cape Verde that was fighting for the joint independence of Guinea and Cape Verde in the Guinea-Bissau War of Independence. The FARP became the national armed forces of Guinea-Bissau when its independence was recognized by Portugal in 1974.

The Armed Forces of Cape Verde were created when the country became independent in 1975, being also officially designated the People's Revolutionary Armed Forces (FARP). The Cape Verdean FARP consisted of two independent branches, the Army and the Coast Guard.

In the early 1990s, the designation "FARP" was dropped and the military of Cape Verde was designated the Cape Verdean Armed Forces (FACV).

In 2007, the FACV started a major reorganization that included the transformation of the Army into the National Guard.

Together with the Cape Verdean Police, the FACV carried out Operation Flying Launch, a successful operation to put an end to a drug trafficking group which smuggled cocaine from Colombia to the Netherlands and Germany using Cape Verde as a reorder point. The operation took more than three years, being a secret operation during the first two years, and ended in 2010.

Although located in Africa, Cape Verde has always had close relations with Europe. Because of this, it has been argued that Cape Verde may be eligible for entry into the Organization for Security and Co-operation in Europe and NATO.

The most recent engagement of the FACV was the Monte Tchota massacre that resulted in 11 deaths.

Structure
The Cape Verdean Armed Forces are part of the Ministry of National Defense of Cape Verde and include:
 the military bodies of command:
 Chief of Staff of the Armed Forces
 Office of the CEMFA
 Staff of the Armed Forces (EMFA)
 Personnel Command
 Logistics Command
 the National Guard
 the Coast Guard

National Guard

The National Guard (Guarda National) is the main branch of the Cape Verdean Armed Forces for the military defense of the country, being responsible for the execution of land and maritime environment operations and the support to internal security. It includes:
 Territorial commands:
 1st Military Region Command
 2nd Military Region Command
 3rd Military Region Command
 Corps:
 Military Police Corps
 Marine Corps
 Artillery Corps

There is no general command of the National Guard. Each military region command is headed by a lieutenant-colonel directly subordinate to the Chief of Staff of the Armed Forces, and includes units of the three corps.

Coast Guard

The Coast Guard (Guarda Costeira) is the branch of the Cape Verdean Armed Forces responsible for the defense and protection of the country's economical interests at the sea under national jurisdiction and for providing air and naval support to land and amphibious operations. It includes:
 Coast Guard Command
 Maritime Security Operations Center (COSMAR)
 Naval Squadron
 Air Squadron

The Coast Guard is headed by an officer with the rank of lieutenant-colonel. The Naval and Air Squadrons incorporate, respectively, all the vessels and aircraft of the Cape Verdean Armed Forces.

Ranks
The rank insignia for commissioned officers for the national guard and coast guard.

The rank insignia of enlisted for the national guard and coast guard.

Equipment

Armored vehicles 
10 BRDM-2

Artillery
12 82-PM-41
6 120-PM-43 mortar

Anti-aircraft
 9K32 Strela-2
18 ZPU-1
12 ZU-23-2

Aircraft 

The Cape Verdean Army used to have its own air arm; after personnel training received from the USSR in 1982, three Antonov An-26 aircraft were delivered to Cape Verde – these were believed to be the only military aircraft possessed by the nation. However these three aircraft were supplemented in 1991 by a Dornier 228 light aircraft equipped for use by the Coast Guard, and, in the late 1990s by an EMB-110 aircraft from Brazil, similarly equipped for maritime operations. The government has been in negotiations with China to acquire multirole helicopters for both military and civilian use.

Current Inventory

Vessels 
 1 Kondor I patrol craft – 360 tons full load – commissioned 1970
 1 Peterson MK 4 patrol craft – 22 tons – commissioned 1993
 1 other patrol craft – 55 tons
 1 Damen Stan 5009 patrol vessel – Guardiao (P511) – commissioned 2012

References 

Further reading: Defense Intelligence Agency, Military Intelligence Summary - Africa South of the Sahara, DDB 2680-104-85, ICOD 15 October 1984, declassified by letter dated April 29, 2014.

External links 

 The World Factbook
 http://www.nationmaster.com/country/cv-cape-verde/mil-military
 https://web.archive.org/web/20110721071532/http://praia.usembassy.gov/about-us/security-assistance-office.html
 http://www.snpc.cv/
 Cape Verde Military Police

Government of Cape Verde